Marescaux is a French surname. Notable people with the surname include: 

Gerald Marescaux (1860–1920), British admiral and army officer
Henri Marescaux (1943–2021), French general and Roman Catholic priest
Jacques Marescaux (b. 1948), French doctor
Kathleen Marescaux (1868–1944), Irish painter, wife of Gerald